"If You Love Me" is a song by American R&B group Brownstone, released on October 24, 1994, by MJJ Music and Epic Records. It is the second single from their debut album, From the Bottom Up (1995). The song was written by Gordon Chambers, Nichole Gilbert, and Dave Hall, and features a sample from "Spellbound" (1990) by American rapper K-Solo. "If You Love Me" was nominated for a Grammy Award for Best R&B Performance by a Duo or Group with Vocal in 1996 but lost to "Creep" by TLC.

"If You Love Me" peaked at number eight on both the US Billboard Hot 100 and the UK Singles Chart as well as number two on the Billboard Hot R&B Singles chart. It topped the New Zealand Singles Chart for five weeks and reached the top 20 in Australia, France, Ireland, and the Netherlands. The music video for the Remix features rapper Craig Mack. In 2015, Canadian rapper Tory Lanez sampled the song for his hit single "Say It". Billboard named the song number 84 on their list of "100 Greatest Girl Group Songs of All Time".

Critical reception
Caroline Sullivan from The Guardian complimented the song's "memorable chorus". Chuck Campbell from Knoxville News Sentinel noted its "mellow seduction". Geoffrey Himes from The Washington Post declared the song as "a firm demand for commitment from a lover." He explained, "It begins with Gilbert and her two partners, Charmayne "Maxee" Maxwell and Monica "Mimi" Doby, singing slow, swooning harmonies over producer Dave Hall's piano. Having established the romantic mood, Gilbert lays down her conditions to a catchy melodic chant and the beat of an insistent drum machine: "If you want my heart/ Then it's time that you start/ To act like you're mine/ In the light and the dark." It's a great single, and it sets the pattern for an album that celebrates the intoxication of romance but demands respect as well."

Track listings

 US maxi-CD single
 "If You Love Me" (Smooth Out remix extended version) – 5:45
 "If You Love Me" (If You Jazz Me remix extended version) – 5:45
 "If You Love Me" (Characters Funk remix extended version) – 5:45
 "If You Love Me" (LP version radio edit) – 3:43
 "If You Love Me" (Soft Touch Mix radio edit) – 3:44

 US 12-inch singleA1. "If You Love Me" (LP version) – 5:04
A2. "If You Love Me" (LP version a cappella) – 3:42
B1. "If You Love Me" (Smooth Out remix extended version) – 5:45
B2. "If You Love Me" (If You Jazz Me remix extended version) – 5:45
B3. "If You Love Me" (Characters Funk remix extended version) – 5:45

 US and UK cassette single; European CD singleA. "If You Love Me" (LP version radio edit) – 3:43
B. "If You Love Me" (Soft Touch mix radio edit) – 3:44

 US maxi-cassette singleA1. "If You Love Me" (Smooth Out remix radio edit)
A2. "If You Love Me" (If You Jazz Me remix radio edit)
A3. "If You Love Me" (Characters Funk remix radio edit)
B1. "If You Love Me" (Smooth Out remix extended version)
B2. "If You Love Me" (If You Jazz Me remix extended version)
B3. "If You Love Me" (Characters Funk remix extended version)

 UK CD1 "If You Love Me" (album version radio edit) – 3:43
 "If You Love Me" (Smooth Out remix radio edit) – 4:14
 "If You Love Me" (If You Jazz Me remix radio edit) – 4:21
 "If You Love Me" (Characters Funk remix radio edit) – 4:14
 "If You Love Me" (Soft Touch Mix radio edit) – 3:44
 "If You Love Me" (acapella) – 3:42

 UK CD2 "If You Love Me" (Channel 9 mix) – 7:33
 "If You Love Me" (Uno Clip dub) – 6:57
 "If You Love Me" (Smooth Out remix extended) – 5:45
 "If You Love Me" (If You Jazz Me remix extended) – 5:45
 "If You Love Me" (Characters Funk remix extended) – 5:45

 Australian maxi-CD single'''
 "If You Love Me" (Smooth Out remix extended) – 5:45
 "If You Love Me" (If You Jazz Me remix extended) – 5:45
 "If You Love Me" (Characters Funk remix extended) – 4:13
 "If You Love Me" (LP version radio edit) – 3:43
 "If You Love Me" (Soft Touch Mix radio edit) – 3:44
 "If You Love Me" (a cappella) – 3:42

Personnel
 Produced by Dave "Jam" Hall for Untouchables Entertainment, Inc.
 Additional production and remixes by
 The Characters: Troy Taylor & Charles Farrar for Character Music Corporation
 Uno Clio

Charts

Weekly charts

Year-end charts

Certifications

References

1994 singles
1994 songs
Brownstone (group) songs
Number-one singles in New Zealand
Song recordings produced by Dave Hall (record producer)
Songs written by Dave Hall (record producer)
Songs written by Gordon Chambers